Public Outreach is a group of private businesses that provide paid fundraising services to charities in Canada, the United States, Australia and New Zealand.

The company was founded in 2002 by James Julien, Bryan McKinnon and John Finlay. The company typically hires people in the 18 to 35 age group. Most of their fundraising is done by face-to-face soliciting on street-corners, door-to-door canvassing and telemarketing campaigns.

Paid charity canvassing by private companies has proved controversial in some cities where it has led to complaints about aggressive soliciting in Victoria, British Columbia.  A Public Outreach manager Emily Smits, said many Canadians find those in her profession “annoying,” even “accosting.” However Public Outreach co-founder John Finlay said Public Outreach tries to alternate busy intersections, rotating “fallow zones” to “give each community a break from being solicited.” Some fundraising companies have raised controversy by paying solicitors by commission and taking a large share from monthly donations which take many months or a year to reach charities. Public Outreach says it does not take commissions and pays its employees by the hour, although they are given targets.

Public Outreach Canada has been hired to raise funds for charities such as Amnesty International and the Canadian Red Cross. Public Outreach Canada has its head offices in Vancouver with a national recruitment centre in Toronto. It fundraises in Victoria, Vancouver, Calgary, Montreal, Quebec City, Toronto, Ottawa, Kitchener and Halifax. A branch in the United States, Public Outreach Fundraising operates in Boston, San Francisco, Oakland and Los Angeles. Public Outreach Australia New Zealand is based in Melbourne, Australia and Auckland New Zealand, and operates in every major city across both countries, as well as regional areas.

References

External links
Public Outreach Canada

Charities based in Canada
Charity fundraisers
2002 establishments in Canada